P. J. Tracy is a pseudonym for American mother-daughter writing team Patricia (P. J.) (b. 1946 d. Stillwater December 21, 2016) and Traci Lambrecht, winners of the Anthony, Barry, Gumshoe, and Minnesota Book Awards. Their ten mystery thrillers include Monkeewrench (published as Want to Play? in the UK), Live Bait, Dead Run, Snow Blind, Shoot to Thrill (published as Play to Kill in the UK), Off the Grid, The Sixth Idea (published a Cold Kill in the UK), Nothing Stays Buried, The Guilty Dead, and Ice Cold Heart.  They also published Return of the Magi, a quirky Christmas novella, as an ebook. After Patricia Lambrecht died in 2016, Traci Lambrecht continued to write under the P. J. Tracy pseudonym.

Novels
Monkeewrench Series
Monkeewrench (2003)  (UK title: Want To Play?)
Won 2004 Barry Award for Best First Mystery Novel 
Live Bait (2004) 
Dead Run (2005) 
Snow Blind (2006) 
Shoot to Thrill (2010)  (UK title: Play to Kill)
Off the Grid (2012)  (UK title: Two Evils)
The Sixth Idea (2016)    (UK title: Cold Kill)
Nothing Stays Buried (2017) 
The Guilty Dead (2018) 
Ice Cold Heart (2020) 
Detective Margaret Nolan series
Deep into the Dark (2021) 
Standalone

 Return of the Magi (2017)

References

External links

21st-century American novelists
American mystery writers
Collective pseudonyms
Anthony Award winners
Barry Award winners
American women novelists
Women mystery writers
21st-century American women writers
Pseudonymous women writers
21st-century pseudonymous writers